The canton of Courseulles-sur-Mer is an administrative division of the Calvados department, northwestern France. It was created at the French canton reorganisation which came into effect in March 2015. Its seat is in Courseulles-sur-Mer.

It consists of the following communes:

Anisy
Arromanches-les-Bains
Asnelles
Banville
Basly
Bazenville
Bernières-sur-Mer
Colomby-Anguerny
Courseulles-sur-Mer
Crépon
Cresserons
Douvres-la-Délivrande
Graye-sur-Mer
Langrune-sur-Mer
Luc-sur-Mer
Meuvaines
Plumetot
Saint-Aubin-sur-Mer
Saint-Côme-de-Fresné
Sainte-Croix-sur-Mer
Ver-sur-Mer

References

Cantons of Calvados (department)